Moment by Moment is a 1978 American romantic drama film written and directed by Jane Wagner and starring Lily Tomlin and John Travolta. It was produced by Robert Stigwood and released by Universal Pictures on December 22, 1978.

The film was shot in Malibu, California from April to July 1978 and also marked the end of Travolta's three-film contract with Stigwood following Saturday Night Fever (1977) and Grease (1978).

Synopsis
Trisha Rawlings is a wealthy middle-aged Beverly Hills socialite suffering from loneliness following a separation from her philandering husband Stu. At a pharmacy, she meets Vick "Strip" Harrison, a suave young drifter whom she had briefly met in the recent past when he worked as a car valet. He becomes infatuated with her, follows her to her Malibu beach house, hangs around despite her cold demeanor and offers her pills in an attempt to woo her.

Trisha is initially annoyed by Strip's flirtation but eventually reciprocates his affections, although not to the same degree. They have lunch, officially beginning their rocky relationship. She enjoys spending time with him, but the age and class differences make her feel ashamed.

When they attend a photography exhibition together, they run into Stu, which makes the situation uncomfortable. After they return home, they argue over their relationship. Strip leaves, but Trisha tracks him down and they reconcile.

Cast
Lily Tomlin as Trisha Rawlings
John Travolta as Strip Harrison
Andra Akers as Naomi
Bert Kramer as Stu Rawlings
Shelley R. Bonus as Peg
Debra Feuer as Stacie
James Luisi as Dan Santini
John O'Leary as Pharmacist
Neil Flanagan as Storekeeper
Jarvais Hudson as Gas Station Attendant
Tom Slocum as Band Leader
Michael Consoldane as Hotel Desk Clerk
Jo Jordan as Bookstore Lady
Joseph Schwab as Druggest
Stan Rodarte as Dancer in Bar (uncredited)

Novelization
A paperback novelization of the screenplay was written by Darcy O'Brien and published by Ballantine Books in January 1979 as a promotional tie-in.

Production
John Travolta and Lily Tomlin were both at the height of their careers when they were cast. Universal Pictures purchased the film rights from producer Robert Stigwood for $8 million, believing the star power of both leads would draw audiences. The film was the first directed by Jane Wagner, Tomlin's now-wife, comedy writer and collaborator. However, during production Universal raised concerns about Wagner and hired Saturday Night Fever director of photography Ralf D. Bode to assist with direction, although he is credited in the film as a technical advisor. Stigwood attempted to have Wagner fired but met resistance from Travolta and Tomlin.

During production, a Los Angeles magazine reported: "The chemistry between Tomlin and Travolta began to rival that between Menachem Begin and Yassar Arafat." A crew staff was also quoted saying: "Two weeks into the shooting on location in Malibu, there was nobody on the set that didn't know we were in the middle of a turkey. It was like being on the voyage of the damned." Two years after its release, Lily Tomlin said of the experience: "John and I were totally unprepared. We thought it was a sweet, small, lightly funny movie. We were not prepared for what others thought. It's the one thing that all performers live in fear of—total failure. And when it happens and you survive, I think you're probably in a much better place. It's made me less cautious. It made me place more importance on the experience of working with other artists than on the reaction of critics or the public."

Soundtrack

Moment by Moment: The Original Soundtrack from the Motion Picture was released on vinyl, cassette tape and 8-track tape by RSO Records in January 1979. Despite the film's poor reputation, its title song was a modest hit for singer Yvonne Elliman.

Side 1:
"Moment by Moment" (Yvonne Elliman) – 3:15
"The Lady Wants To Know" (Michael Franks) – 4:32
"Everybody Needs Love" (Stephen Bishop) – 3:40
"Moment by Moment Theme (Reprise – Instrumental)" (Lee Holdridge) – 1:07
"You Know I Love You" (Charles Lloyd) – 3:25
"Sometimes When We Touch" (Dan Hill) – 4:03

Side 2:
"Moment by Moment (Main Theme – Instrumental)" (Lee Holdridge) – 2:57
"For You and I" (10cc) – 5:20
"Hollywood Boulevard (Instrumental)" (Ray Parker Jr.) – 3:34
"Your Heart Never Lies" (Charles Lloyd) – 5:07
"Moment by Moment ("On the Beach" – Instrumental)" (Lee Holdridge & John Klemmer) – 2:15
"Moment by Moment (Reprise) Film Version" (Yvonne Elliman) – 4:00

Charts

Album

Single

Critical response
Moment by Moment was widely panned by critics and moviegoers.

Vincent Canby of The New York Times wrote: "It's very difficult to understand what Miss Tomlin and Jane Wagner, who wrote and directed the film, wanted to do in 'Moment by Moment.' As romantic drama it's pretty tepid. That the two stars look enough alike to be brother and sister is no help, and though Miss Wagner's camera comes in for some tactful close-ups of flesh in the love scenes, they are singularly unerotic. One has the impression that these two lovers would prefer to be doing something else."

Variety wrote that the film "has to rate as one of the major disappointments of 1978. What seemed like inspired casting on paper, the teaming of John Travolta and Lily Tomlin, fails badly in execution."

Gene Siskel awarded the film 1.5 stars out of 4 and called it "a thoroughly awkward, frequently laughable love story that Travolta would do well not to defend, but to simply forget and move on to his next project. Chalk it up to working with the wrong people at the wrong time." Roger Ebert said on their TV show that the movie wasn't just bad—it was a "disaster."

Gary Arnold of The Washington Post wrote: "The circumscribed nature of Jane Wagner's screenplay and the hazy nature of her direction tend to divorce the film from any semblance of reality, both social and erotic. For all practical purposes 'Moment by Moment' is a two-character idyll, concentrated at a location—the heroine's Malibu Colony beachhouse—that seems imaginary."

Gilbert Adair of The Monthly Film Bulletin stated: "Critics are fond of attributing a film's badness to some hypothetical computer; this truly terrible movie might have been made by HAL in his most maudlin 'Bicycle-built-for-two' mood, as the plugs were being pulled out."

Kevin Thomas of the Los Angeles Times was more positive in his review: "There have been many complaints that there is a lack of chemistry between the stars and that their dialogue is banal in the utmost ... Yet for those of us who respond to the intense concern Wagner projects for Tomlin and Travolta, there actually is chemistry between them and what they have to say to each other sounds lifelike rather than merely trite. At any rate, Tomlin and Travolta clearly have trusted in Wagner completely, giving themselves entirely to their roles, with Tomlin underplaying to Travolta's engaging projection of vulnerability."

Moment by Moment holds a 25% rating on Rotten Tomatoes based on eight reviews.

Legacy 
The film has found popularity with some for its camp value, and the producers of Mystery Science Theater 3000 unsuccessfully attempted to obtain the rights to broadcast and mock the film on their show.

Release
Kino Lorber released the film on DVD and Blu-ray on August 24, 2021. The release includes an audio commentary, radio spots and a theatrical trailer.

References

External links

1978 films
1970s English-language films
1978 romantic drama films
American romantic drama films
Films directed by Jane Wagner
Films with screenplays by Jane Wagner
Universal Pictures films
Films produced by Robert Stigwood
Films scored by Lee Holdridge
Films shot in California
Films set in Malibu, California
1979 soundtrack albums
RSO Records soundtracks
1978 directorial debut films
Drama film soundtracks
1970s American films